Madonna and Child with Saints, Madonna and Child Enthroned with the Infant St John the Baptist, St John the Evangelist and Saint Catherine of Alexandria or the San Giorgio Madonna is a 1593 oil on canvas painting by Annibale Carracci, originally in the Landini chapel in the church of San Giorgio in Poggiale, Bologna. During the 19th century the conservation conditions there worsened and it was moved to the Accademia di Belle Arti for restoration, before being moved to its current home in the then-new Pinacoteca Nazionale di Bologna.. It is signed and dated "ANNI CARR FE MDXCIII".

Autograph status 

The work was praised in the 17th century by Giovanni Pietro Bellori and Carlo Cesare Malvasia, the artist's main biographers of that century, but it came to be less-appreciated over the course of the 20th century, with the first modern scholar of Annibale Hans Tieze even spreading the opinion that much of the work was by Annibale's follower Lucio Massari. That idea was refuted by Rudolf Wittkower, but partly supported by Donald Posner, one of the major scholars on Annibale, who felt that surviving preparatory drawings were autograph, but the colouring was partly or wholly down to Massari. Posner supported this conclusion by reference to a canvas now in Berlin which is clearly connected to the Bologna work and which he attributed to Massari, seeing it as another proof of the student's debt to the master in the Bologna work. Posner's conclusion has been overthrown by preparatory drawings for the Bologna work definitely in Annibale's hand which - with the historic sources stating the work was by Carracci himself - seem to confirm its autograph status. Modern scholarship also holds the Berlin work to be by Annibale's nephew Antonio Carracci rather than Massari, thus representing Antonio drawing on his uncle's work at San Giorgio rather than Massari drawing on his master's.

Gallery

References

External links

Paintings by Annibale Carracci
Paintings in the collection of the Pinacoteca Nazionale di Bologna
Paintings depicting John the Baptist
Paintings depicting John the Apostle
Paintings of Catherine of Alexandria
Paintings of the Madonna and Child